Pülümür District is a district of Tunceli Province in Turkey. The town of Pülümür is its seat and the district had a population of 3,282 in 2021.

Composition 
Beside the town of Pülümür, the district encompasses forty-nine villages and 267 hamlets.

 Ağaşenliği
 Akdik
 Altınhüseyin
 Ardıçlı
 Bardakçı
 Başkalecik
 Boğalı
 Bozağakaraderbendi
 Çağlayan
 Çakırkaya
 Çobanyıldızı
 Dağbek
 Dağyolu
 Dereboyu
 Dereköy
 Derindere
 Doğanpınar
 Efeağılı
 Elmalı
 Göcenek
 Gökçekonak
 Hacılı
 Hasangazi
 Kabadal
 Kangallı
 Karagöz
 Kayırlar
 Kaymaztepe
 Kırdım
 Kırklar
 Kırkmeşe
 Kızılmescit
 Kocatepe
 Kovuklu
 Közlüce
 Kuzulca
 Mezraa
 Nohutlu
 Sağlamtaş
 Salkımözü
 Sarıgül
 Senek
 Süleymanuşağı
 Şampaşakaraderbendi
 Taşlık
 Turnadere
 Üçdam
 Ünveren
 Yarbaşı

References 

Districts of Tunceli Province
Pülümür District